Virola melinonii is a species of tree in the family Myristicaceae.

References

melinonii